Kane was a Dutch rock band. In its final stage, the group consisted of the two original members, Dinand Woesthoff (lead vocals) and Dennis van Leeuwen (guitar). The band was inspired by U2, Pearl Jam, Queen, and Nirvana.

History
Kane got its start in The Hague in 1998, when Dinand and Dennis met each other in a beach cafe where they were both working at the time. Both had a passion for music and it did not take long before they were discovered in a small cafe where they performed for a very small audience.

Their breakthrough came in the summer of 1999 with the song "Where Do I Go Now". Their record As Long as You Want This from 1999 was on the album hit list for 1.5 years and achieved double platinum sales. With their second album in 2001, called So Glad You Made It, the group scored several big hits. One of the biggest hit singles was "Let It Be".

In the following years Kane received some big awards, including TMF awards, MTV Europe music awards, and an Edison. They performed at big festivals like Parkpop and Pinkpop.

Woesthoff devoted the song "Dreamer" to his wife Guusje Nederhorst, who died in 2004. This single immediately reached the number 1 chart position and became the best-selling single of 2004.

Kane tried to make a career abroad, but with only little success in Belgium and a No. 38 UK chart position for "Rain Down on Me", it didn't go too well. The fact that there was an American southern rock band called Kane and that the name of English piano rock band Keane resembles Kane's didn't help them much either.

The band's third album, Fearless, hit No. 1 on the Dutch charts when it came out. The first two singles, "Something to Say" and "Fearless", came in at No. 1 as well.

On 13 August 2005 Kane did an open-air performance on the beach of Almere. It was attended by over 30,000 people. A few days before, the band had performed in front of 1,500 people in Paradiso, Amsterdam. In December 2005, they ended the year with a performance in Rotterdam Ahoy.

In December 2014, Kane disbanded.

Band members
Kane has had a long history of changes in the band formation. Since their founding in 1998, the group has had 19 different band members, although some of those members only played on the recording of the live album February.

At the end of 2004, bass player Dion Murdock left the band, as he wanted to play drums for the Dutch band Intwine. Murdock was replaced by Yolanda Charles, who played for Robbie Williams's band. She only played on the album Fearless. Bassist Manuel Hugas, who played on the CD/DVD February too, later played for Kane, but only during live shows.

Vocals
 Dinand Woesthoff

Guitars
 Dennis van Leeuwen
 Robin Berlin
 Paul Jan Bakker (fired)
 Tony Cornelissen (left the band)

Bass
 Daniele Labbate
 Ivo Severijns (left the band)
 Manuel Hugas (left the band)
 Yolanda Charles (only on Fearless)
 Dion Murdock (left the band)
 Aram Kersbergen (left the band)
 Matto Kranenburg (fired)

Drums
 Bram Hakkens
 Wim van der Westen (left the band)
 Joost Kroon (left the band)
 Martijn Bosman (left the band)
 André Kemp (left the band)
 Cyril Directie (left the band)
 Sammy de Fretes (original drummer, never recorded)

Keyboards
 Anan den Boer
 Nico Brandsen (left the band)
 Ronald Kool (left the band)
 Ricky van Poppel (left the band)

Others
 Hans Eijkenaar (drums on As Long as You Want This)
 Cor Mutsers (guitars)
 Wiboud Burkens (piano)
 Mike Booth (trumpet)
 Peter Lieberom (saxophone)

Discography

Studio albums

Live albums

Compilations

Singles

Other charted songs

References

External links

 Official website (archived)
 Biography of Kane at the Popinstituut, via the Wayback Machine
 Biography of Kane at the Muziekencyclopedie of the Netherlands Institute for Sound and Vision

Dutch rock music groups
Musical groups established in 1998
Musical groups disestablished in 2014
MTV Europe Music Award winners
Musical groups from The Hague